Edward Allen Buchanan (born October 19, 1967) is an American politician, attorney, and military veteran, who  served as the Wyoming Secretary of State from 2018 to 2022. Prior to being Secretary of State, Buchanan was a member and past Speaker of the Wyoming House of Representatives.

Political career
A Republican, Buchanan represented House District 4 from 2003 until 2013, first in Goshen County and then from Platte and Converse counties. Buchanan was Majority Leader of the Wyoming House of Representatives from 2009 until 2011, and was elected Speaker of the Wyoming House of Representatives in 2011. He served until his retirement in 2013, and was succeeded as Speaker by Tom Lubnau of Gillette in Campbell County.

Buchanan ran for Wyoming Secretary of State in the 2014 elections, narrowly losing the contest in a four-way race. After Secretary of State Ed Murray resigned, Governor Matt Mead appointed Buchanan to serve the remaining 10 months of Murray's term. He was subsequently elected to a full term in the 2018 election defeating James W. Byrd. In 2021, Buchanan was considered by early polling to be the leading potential candidate to take on Rep. Liz Cheney in 2022. Ultimately, Buchanan chose to remain in his role as Secretary of State. He initially ran for re-election in 2022, but withdrew to become a district court judge.

On July 30, Governor Mark Gordon appointed Buchanan to be District Judge of the Eighth Judicial District. Buchanan announced he would resign early from the secretary of state position, and did so on September 17. Karl Allred was subsequently appointed acting secretary and sworn in on October 3, 2022.

Personal life
Buchanan moved to Wyoming with his family at age 3 and grew up farming and ranching on the Bar KW ranch in Goshen County. Buchanan holds both bachelor's and law degrees from the University of Wyoming at Laramie. He also received a master's degree in public administration from the University of Colorado at Colorado Springs, while serving in the United States Air Force. He and his wife Amber have two girls and two boys.

References

External links
Wyoming House page on Buchanan
Project Vote Smart bio

|-

1967 births
21st-century American politicians
American Protestants
Living people
People from Torrington, Wyoming
Politicians from Fort Lauderdale, Florida
Secretaries of State of Wyoming
Speakers of the Wyoming House of Representatives
United States Air Force airmen
University of Colorado alumni
University of Wyoming alumni
Wyoming lawyers
Republican Party members of the Wyoming House of Representatives